Outwood Academy Easingwold is a mixed 11–18 secondary school with academy status in Easingwold, North Yorkshire, England. It had 915 pupils in 2017, including an on-site sixth form.

The school is operated by Outwood Grange Academies Trust, and the current principal is Laura Eddery.

History
Easingwold School was founded in 1784 by a charitable bequest of Eleanor Westerman. There seems to have been a previous school or grammar school in Easingwold, mentioned in 1564.

The school moved to its current larger site in 1954 and became a mixed, comprehensive school. The previous school site now houses Easingwold Primary School. In 1994 the Europa Block was added to the school to increase the number of classrooms available, specifically for languages. Since then a new maths block, science block and separate Sixth Form block have been added to the school grounds.

In October 2016, Ofsted published an inspection report that found the overall effectiveness of Easingwold School to be Inadequate. The school was subsequently placed into special measures, with Headteacher Phil Benaiges removed from his post and replaced by Rob Pritchard as interim executive headteacher. In April 2017, it was announced the school would reopen as an academy in September 2017, sponsored by Outwood Grange Academies Trust.

On 1 April 2018 Easingwold School converted to academy status sponsored by Outwood Grange Academies Trust, and became Outwood Academy Easingwold.

Head Teachers
 1951–1954, Ronald Winder
 1955-1957, J. D. Hobkinson.
 1958–1981, Robin Gilbert
 1981–1993, Roger Kirk
 1993–2000, Peter Fletcher
 2000–2012, Carey Chidwick
 2012 (February–August), Geoff Jenkinson (Interim)
 September 2012–October 2016, Phil Benaiges
 October 2016–July 2017, Rob Pritchard (Interim Executive Headteacher)
 August 2017–present, Laura Eddery

Notable former pupils
 Stephen Hester, CEO of RSA Insurance Group, Former CEO of Royal Bank of Scotland
 Bobby Mimms, former professional footballer
 Sir Clive Woodward
 Jane Robinson, historian
 Tommy Banks (chef)
 Kevin Hollinrake
 Matthew Fisher (cricketer), England Cricketer

References

 BBC School Report

External links
 

Secondary schools in North Yorkshire
Academies in North Yorkshire
Easingwold
Easingwold